Cowboy poetry is a form of poetry that grew from a tradition of cowboys telling stories.

Authorship
Contrary to common belief, cowboy poetry does not actually have to be written by cowboys, though adherents would claim that authors should have some connection to the cowboy life such that they can write poetry with an "insider's perspective". One example of a popular "cowboy poem" written by a non-cowboy is "The Ride of Paul Venarez" by Eben E. Rexford, a 19th-Century freelance author.

Style
Newcomers are surprised to hear that cowboy poetry is contemporary. Many poets tend to focus on the historic cowboy lifestyle, historical events and the humorous aspects of the cowboy life style. However, the work that cowboys do continues.  The cowboy lifestyle is a living tradition that exists in western North America and other areas, thus, contemporary cowboy poetry is still being created, still being recited, and still entertaining many at cowboy poetry gatherings, around campfires and cowboy poetry competitions. Much of what is known as "old time" country music originates from the rhyming couplet style often seen in cowboy poetry along with guitar music.

Themes
Typical themes of cowboy poetry include:
 Ranch work and those who perform it
 Western lifestyle
 Landscape of the American and Canadian West
 Cowboy values and practices
 Humorous anecdotes
 Memories of times and people long gone
 Sarcasm regarding modern contraptions and/or ways

The following is a verse from LaVerna Johnson's poem "Homestead", which exhibits traditional cowboy poetry features:

(Note the use of cowboy vernacular such as quakie (Populus tremuloides, trembling poplar or aspen known as a "quakie tree")).

Though it deals with those who work with livestock and nature, it would be incorrect to categorize cowboy poetry as pastoral. Cowboy poetry is noted for its romantic imagery, but at no time does it sacrifice realism in favor of it.

Few examples of experimental verse are known in cowboy poetry. One argument is that cowboy poetry is meant to be recited and should "sound like poetry." The counter-argument runs that imposing a particular structure on cowboy poetry would move the focus away from the subject matter. Regardless, most cowboy poets stay within more classical guidelines, especially rhyming verse. Free verse poetry is uncommon in cowboy poetry.

Poetry weeks
Cowboy poetry continues to be written and celebrated today. Baxter Black is probably the most famous, and possibly the most prolific, contemporary cowboy poet. In addition to the National Cowboy Poetry Gathering held every year in Elko, Nevada, many cities in the United States and Canada have annual "roundups" dedicated to cowboy poetry. Cowboy Poetry week is celebrated each April in the United States and Canada.

Notable cowboy poets 
 S. Omar Barker
 Baxter Black
 Arthur Chapman
 Badger Clark
 Curley Fletcher
 Steven Fromholz
 Cathy Park Hong
 Bruce Kiskaddon
 Wally McRae
 Waddie Mitchell
 Joel Nelson
 Red Steagall
 Paul Zarzyski

In addition, Robert W. Service is sometimes classified as a cowboy poet.

Famed spoken-word artist Bingo Gazingo has done at least one cowboy poem, "Everything's OK at the OK Corral."

See also 
 Bush ballads
 Cowboy
 "Faster Horses (The Cowboy and the Poet)"
 Rodeo
 Western lifestyle

Notes

External links
 National Cowboy Poetry Gathering, Elko, Nevada
 Pincher Creek, Alberta, Cowboy Gathering
 Cowboy and Western Poetry at the Bar-D Ranch
 Jim Janke's Old West Cowboy Poetry
 Texas Cowboy Poetry Gathering
 Video from Texas Cowboy Poetry Gathering
 cowboy poetry gathering in Cartersville, GA
 Website of the Alberta Cowboy Poetry Association
 "Cowboy Poets" film at folkstreams.net
 Western & Cowboy Poetry by Clark Crouch
 Waddie Mitchell web page
 KPOV-FM Community Radio features Cowboy Poetry on the "Calling All Cowboys" online radio program.  Live broadcast on 88.9 KPOV, on Wednesdays at 6PM and Sundays at 4PM (Pacific time) through the "Listen Live" link. It can also be streamed on demand at the following link: http://kpov-od.streamguys.us/calling_all_cowboys_new_56k.mp3

Genres of poetry
Cowboy culture